Salvador Vassallo (born 16 September 1968) is a Puerto Rican former swimmer who competed in the 1988 Summer Olympics.

Salvador is the youngest of five sons of industrialist Víctor Vassallo and Daysi Anadón. His brothers are Marcos, Víctor (b. 1960), Jesse (b. 1961), and Vicente.

References

1968 births
Living people
Puerto Rican male swimmers
Puerto Rican male freestyle swimmers
Male medley swimmers
Olympic swimmers of Puerto Rico
Swimmers at the 1988 Summer Olympics